Anthocharis cardamines phoenissa is a subspecies of orange tip butterfly found mostly in the Middle East. "Of local forms we have to mention phoenissa Kalrhh.. from Syria, like ab. turritis, but purer white beneath."

References

Anthocharis
Butterfly subspecies